Gianturco is an Italian surname. People with the surname include:

 Cesare Gianturco (1905–1995), Italian-American physician 
 Emanuele Gianturco (1857–1907), Italian legal scholar and politician 
 Paola Gianturco (born 1939), American photojournalist and businessperson

Surnames of Italian origin